Father of lies is a 1998 novel by Brian Evenson.  This psychological thriller describes moral corruption in a conservative religious sect which shares some of the characteristics of the LDS Church.

Father of lies is written from three perspectives: from Provost Fochs, from his analyst Dr Alexander Feshtig and from the text of letters exchanged between Feshtig and his superiors in the church hierarchy.

Plot
Eldon Fochs is a 38-year-old accountant and lay provost. He is happily married with four children.  Feshtig works as a therapist in an Institute of Psychoanalysis funded and controlled by the church.  Fochs is persuaded to go to Feshtig by his wife, who has a growing suspicion that her husband harbours dark secrets.

Fochs slowly reveals the contents of his dreams and his "disturbing thoughts" about children to Feshtig. He reveals two dreams; one when he strangles and dismembers a girl and another of a 12-year-old boy. In the dream, the boy comes into his office and Fochs brutally sodomises him. He frightens the boy with threats and forces him to admit to having been molested by an uncle, something that never happened.  Fochs claims that in his dream he was guided by God.

In the chapters where Fochs is in the first person, he describes how he assaulted and murdered a 14-year-old girl. He also describes his ecclesiastical superior confronting him with allegations from two mothers that he has molested their boys. He denies the allegations, and his superiors choose to believe him.

Feshtig meets with one of the mothers and starts to counsel her son Nathan Mears, and he gradually uncovers the extent of the damage that Fochs has done to the young boy.  As the abuse allegations reach the media, the pressure on the church mounts, but it does everything to protect itself and its reputation, going as far as to excommunicate the two mothers. The pressure on Fochs from his wife is more difficult to answer as she presses him on what he was doing the night the girl was murdered. Eventually he rams his car into a tree, having surreptitiously unclipped his wife’s seat belt.  She is thrown through the window and killed.

Feshtig reveals his conclusions to the police, but their DNA tests are inconclusive.  Protected by the church, Fochs still contrives to spend time alone with young boys in order to molest them. He is eventually transferred to a teaching position in another city, free to carry on his abuse.

As the novel ends, having assaulted his children’s babysitter, Fochs sinks to a further level of depravity and starts a cycle of incest with his eldest daughter.

External links
 Author's web site
 Interview with author 

1998 novels
Novels about ephebophilia